Jucaraseps is an extinct genus of small squamate lizard known from the Early Cretaceous of Las Hoyas, Spain. It contains a single species, Jucaraseps grandipes. It belonged to the clade Scincogekkonomorpha (containing scleroglossan squamates and those taxa which were more closely related to them than to Iguania) and was related to the clade Scleroglossa as well to Jurassic and Cretaceous taxa Eichstaettisaurus, Ardeosaurus, Bavarisaurus, Parviraptor, Yabeinosaurus and Sakurasaurus

References

Cretaceous lizards
Fossils of Spain
La Huérguina Formation
Fossil taxa described in 2012